Tullie House Museum and Art Gallery is a museum in Carlisle, England. Opened by the Carlisle Corporation in 1893, the original building is a converted Jacobean mansion, with extensions added when it was converted.  At first the building contained the museum and also a library, an art school and a technical school.

The building, including the extensions, is a Grade I listed building, and the wall, gates and railings in front of the house are separately Grade I listed.

The two schools were moved in the 1950s and the library in 1986. The museum expanded into the city Guildhall in 1980 and with new space available from 1986 it underwent an extensive redevelopment over 1989–90 and again in 2000–01.

Since May 2011 the museum has been an independent charitable trust, the Tullie House Museum and Art Gallery Trust. It is one of the three members of the Cumbria Museum Consortium, along with Lakeland Arts and the Wordsworth Trust. In 2012–15 and 2015–18 this consortium was one of the 21 museums or consortia (16 in the earlier period) to be funded by Arts Council England as "Major Partner Museums".

Collections 

The museum has large and eclectic collections of zoological, botanical and geological material. The plant collector, Clara Winsome Muirhead worked at the museum in the 1940s and donated a large collection of botanical specimens to the museum. The fine and decorative arts collections include works by Burne-Jones and other Pre-Raphaelite artists, as well as Stanley Spencer, Winifred Nicholson, Sheila Fell and Phil Morsman.

Musical instruments 
There is collection of stringed instruments including a violin by Andrea Amati from the royal collection of France.

Roman Britain 
There were two Roman forts in Carlisle, one of which, Uxelodunum (or Stanwix to use the modern toponym), was the largest along the length of Hadrian's Wall. The museum houses important collections and temporary exhibitions associated with Hadrian's Wall.

Post-Roman history 
The human history collection also features permanent exhibitions dedicated to the Vikings and the Border Reivers.

Accolades 
Tullie House Museum won the annual Family Friendly Museum Award (sponsored by the Telegraph Media Group) in 2015.

Gallery

See also

Grade I listed buildings in Cumbria
Listed buildings in Carlisle, Cumbria

References

External links 

iRomans Website about Carlisle and the region's Roman history

Buildings and structures in Carlisle, Cumbria
Museums in Cumbria
Art museums and galleries in Cumbria
Houses in Cumbria
Museums established in 1893
Grade I listed buildings in Cumbria
Natural history museums in England
Archaeological museums in England
Geology museums in England
History museums in Cumbria
Textile museums in the United Kingdom
Fashion museums in the United Kingdom
Musical instrument museums in England
Local museums in Cumbria
1893 establishments in England
Tourist attractions in Cumbria